Improved Samba Mahsuri  (RP Bio-226) is a high yielding fine grain rice variety. In a collaborative project, scientists from CSIR-CCMB and the ICAR-Indian Institute of Rice Research (IIRR, erstwhile Directorate of Rice Research [DRR]), worked together to develop it. 
The variety was developed using Marker assisted selection and has three major bacterial blight resistance genes Xa21, xa13 and xa5. All India Coordinated Rice Improved Project (AICRIP) conducted trails in multiple locations across India, and found positive results for resistance to bacterial blight.

Pedigree
Samba Mahsuri*4/SS1113

Recommended States
The grain has been recommended for use in the following states; Telangana, Andhra Pradesh, Chhattisgarh, Orissa, Jharkhand, Bihar, Gujarat and Maharashtra.

Features of Improved Samba Mahsuri
 Resistant to bacterial blight disease - Significantly, under conditions of bacterial blight infestation, Improved Samba Mahsuri gives 15-30% more yield than any other bacterial blight susceptible variety.
 High yielding (4.75 to 5.0 tonnes/ha)
 Fine grain variety possessing premium grain and cooking quality - Improved Samba Mahsuri also possesses excellent grain and cooking quality features on par with Samba Mahsuri in terms of hulling percentage (70%), Head rice recovery (65%), Kernel length (5.0 mm), Kernel breadth (1.8 mm), L/B ratio (2.7), Kernel length after cooking (8.7 mm), Elongation ratio (1.7), Alkali spreading value (4.5) and Amylose content (24.8).
 Total Duration: 135–140 days

Performance of Improved Samba Mahsuri across the states (Frontline Demonstrations)
During 2009 Kharif season, in Andhra Pradesh Frontline Demonstrations (FLDs)  were conducted by Directorate of Rice Research in collaboration with Andhra Pradesh Rice Research Institute (APRRI), Maruteru in two districts of Andhra Pradesh viz., West Godavari and Mahaboobanagar.

In West Godavari, even though the yield advantage of Improved Samba Mahsuri was not significant enough, the cost of cultivation has gone down because of resistance to the Bacterial Leaf Blight. The BPT 5204 (Samba Mahsuri) is a popular variety grown in this region, but the variety is susceptible to Bacterial Leaf Blight (BLB). Farmers were impressed by this new variety and many farmers started asking the seed for next season. To that extent these demonstrations have helped generating the awareness about the new variety.

Since Bacterial Leaf Blight is a serious problem in this area, the variety developed by DRR and Centre for Cellular and Molecular Biology (CCMB), Hyderabad through Maker Assisted Backcross Breeding would be a boon to the farmers, not only in AP but also for farmers in other states where BLB is a serious problem.

Performance in Gujarat
In Gujarat rice is grown in 14 districts. The Productivity of rice in Gujarat state is very poor i.e., 1,356 kg/ha as against 1,947 kg/ha average productivity of the nation. More than 40% rice area is concentrated in very low productivity group followed by nearly 40% area in medium-low productivity group. Hence there is a scope for enhancing the rice productivity in farmers’ fields.

In 2010, 37 FLDs were organized in nine locations covering 150 farmers by Main Research Station, Nawagam (Anand Agricultural University). Kharif being the dry and unfavourable season of the region, over all performance of demonstrated technologies could be considered as significant. The yield advantages of these varieties were in the range of 28% to 67%. Out of 37 FLDs, 2 FLDs were conducted on Improved Samba Mahsuri by Directorate of Rice Research, in collaboration with the Main Research Station. In an area of 2.0 ha, it has recorded yield advantage of 32% compared to the local check.

References

External links
 Indian Institute of Rice Research (formerly Directorate of Rice Research 

Rice varieties
Rice production in India